Mevasa is a town and former princely state on Saurashtra peninsula in Gujarat, western India.

History
The minor princely state in Jhalawar prant, ruled by Kathi Chieftains, comprised the town and five other villages. It had a combined population of 619 in 1901, yielding a state revenue of 6,796 Rupees (1903-4, mostly from land) and a paying a tribute of 559 Rupees, to the British and Sukhdi State.mevasa Prince of Darbar shri merubapu surigbapu khachar, mevasa(chotila) state village of 2village mota haraniya(chotila) and naniyani(chotila) land of darbar gadh 1400 Acer in the Darbar shri merubapu khachar of the son darbar shri ramkubapu khachar & darbar shri manubapu khachar

See also
There are two other villages, Mevasa Khadiya and Mevasa Kamribaina, in Junagadh taluka (Sorath prant).

External links
 Imperial Gazetteer, on dsal.uchicago.edu

Princely states of Gujarat